Alf Marinius Engen (May 15, 1909–July 20, 1997) was a Norwegian-American skier. He set several ski jumping world records during the 1930s and helped establish numerous ski areas in the Western United States. Engen is best known for his ski school at Alta in Utah and as the pioneer of powder skiing.

Background
Born in Norway in the town of Mjøndalen, in Nedre Eiker municipality in Buskerud county, Engen was the first son of Trond and Martha Oen Engen.  His two younger brothers, Sverre (1911–2001) and Corey (1916–2006), were also accomplished skiers. As the first-born son of a famous skiing father, Engen was naturally reared to ski.

After his father died of the Spanish flu in 1918 when he was nine, Engen's mother moved the family the short distance to the small town of Steinberg.  In 1929 at age twenty, Alf and his brother Sverre (age 18) emigrated to the United States, first settling in Chicago, then relocating west to Utah in 1931 at Salt Lake City.  Their widowed mother Martha and younger brother Corey (age 17) joined them in 1933.

Career
Engen quickly gained a reputation for his world class skiing skills.  Although primarily a ski jumper when he arrived in the U.S., he quickly mastered alpine skiing and is credited for developing the technique of powder skiing, honed at the Alta Ski Area. The following years he won numerous American and international titles.  In 1940, Engen finished first in the National Four-way, held east of Seattle, Washington. Engen was also the recipient of numerous awards including the All-American Ski Trophy, 1937, Americanism Award in 1940, Helm's Hall of Fame Award in 1954; and Skier's Hall of Fame Award in 1956.

He helped establish the ski school at Alta, and assisted in the creation of thirty other ski resorts in the western United States.  The three Engen brothers helped to popularize skiing in the West, primarily in Utah and Idaho.  Alf's son Alan carries on the family tradition at Alta. Alf Engen died in Salt Lake City in 1997, at the age of 88; his two younger brothers both lived to the age of 90.

Alf Engen Ski Museum
It contains more than 300 trophies, medals, uniforms, scrapbooks, skis, boots, photos, films, and other collectables that span some 70 years in the career of the Engen family. The museum's educational component gives school children a skiing-based foundation to study subjects such as the water cycle, physics, and Utah's colorful history.

The Museum recently added a fully functional virtual ski experience designed and built by Utah-based company Unrivaled. The ride takes visitors through a downhill ski experience and gives the authentic feeling of skiing by adding blowing wind and falling snow features.

Invalid ski jumping world record

 Not recognized! He stood at WR, but this record never made it to WR official books.
 Not recognized! He stood at WR, but Utah SC wasn't member of Western American Winter Sport Ass..
 Not recognized! He stood at world record distance, but set at unofficial competition.
 Not recognized! He stood at world record distance, but at practice session.

Video
Vimeo.com – Alf Engen - The Old Man Of The Mountain - Powder segment

References

External links
 Alf Engen Ski Museum
 U.S. Ski and Snowboard Hall of Fame – Alf Engen
 KUED.org – Alf Engen: Utah's athlete of the century
 Alf Engen Scrapbooks – University of Utah's Marriott Library: Special Collections
 Alf Engen Paper at University of Utah Digital Library, Marriott Library Special Collections
 Alan K Engen Papers at University of Utah Digital Library, Marriott Library Special Collections
 Alta Historical Society – Early history of Alta
Alf Engen papers, 1915-1972 – Archives West
Alf Engen Ski Museum records, 1993-2007 – Archives West 

1909 births
1997 deaths
Norwegian male alpine skiers
American male alpine skiers
Norwegian emigrants to the United States